William Plunkett may refer to:

 William Plunkett (highwayman), 18th-century British highwayman and associate of James MacLaine
 William C. Plunkett, lieutenant governor of Massachusetts (1854–1855)
William Plunket, 1st Baron Plunket (1764–1854), Irish politician and lawyer who eventually became Lord Chancellor of Ireland
William Plunket, 4th Baron Plunket (1828–1897), Church of Ireland Dean of Christ Church Cathedral and Archbishop of Dublin
William Plunket, 5th Baron Plunket (1864–1920), British diplomat and administrator
Billy Plunkett (1914–1960), Australian rules footballer for Geelong